Marcel Kerff (2 June 1866 – 7 August 1914) was a Belgian cyclist who participated in the 1903 Tour de France, where he finished sixth.

At the age of 48, after the German invasion of Belgium at the beginning of the First World War, Kerff was assumed to have been spying on German soldiers and was subsequently hung.

A monument memorializing all Belgian cyclists that died during this war was erected later on in Moelingen near the place where he died.

His brothers Leopold Kerff and Charles Kerff were also professional cyclists.

References 

1866 births
1914 deaths
Executed Belgian people
Belgian male cyclists
Civilians killed in World War I
People from Voeren
Cyclists from Limburg (Belgium)
People executed by the German Empire
People executed by Germany by hanging